Pillar and Ennerdale Fells is a Site of Special Scientific Interest (SSSI) in Ennerdale, Cumbria, England. The area is 425.25 ha.

History
The site was notified in 1991. The site includes Side Wood on the south side of Ennerdale Water, which was formerly part of the adjacent Ennerdale SSSI.

Ecology

Side Wood, which rises from Ennerdale Water, is a good example of an upland birch Betula pubescens – sessile oak Quercus petraea woodland. While there are higher woods in the Lake District, Side Wood is important as an example of altitudinal succession. The vegetation changes from "native upland birch-oak woodland at 120 m" on the shores of the lake, through "sub-montane heaths and grasslands to montane heaths along the summit ridge at an altitude of 890 m".

Above the woodland is gently sloping heathland dominated by heather, bell heather and bilberry; the associated grasses are sheep's-fescue, common bent, mat-grass, tormentil and heath bedstraw. Higher up, bilberry and grasses predominate, while on the summit ridge, where the snow lies late, mosses, sedges, lichens and viviparous fescue occur.

The crags of Pillar, away from grazing sheep, are home to a lush, herb-rich upland ledge community of plants. Breeding birds on Pillar and Ennerdale Fells include buzzard, peregrine falcon, merlin, raven, wheatear, whinchat, ring ouzel and red grouse.

Ennerdale is managed as a rewilding project called "Wild Ennerdale", which was established in 2003. The Wild Ennerdale Partnership gives scope for the management of this site holistically at the landscape scale.

Other measures of protection
The SSSI is one of ten underpinning a Special Area of Conservation, Lake District High Fells, which was designated in 2005.

See also
SSSIs in Cumbria

References

Sites of Special Scientific Interest in Cumbria
Forests and woodlands of Cumbria
Protected areas established in 1991